Kathryn "Katie" Orscher (born June 18, 1984) is an American figure skater who competed as a single skater and pair skater. With partner Garrett Lucash, she is the 2005 U.S. national champion and 2005 Four Continents bronze medalist.

Personal life
Katie Orscher was born in Farmington, Connecticut and raised in Glastonbury, Connecticut.

Career

Singles career
Orscher was originally a single skater. She won the junior bronze medal at the 2000 U.S. Championships. She retired from singles in November 2000 to compete in pairs.

Pairs career
From 2000 through 2006, she competed with partner Garrett Lucash. Lucash remembered her during his search for a partner and gave her a call. They both rotate clockwise. They trained in Simsbury, Connecticut.

In 2005, Orscher and Lucash won the gold medal at the U.S. Championships. They went on to win the bronze medal at the 2005 Four Continents Championships. At the 2005 Worlds, their placement combined with that of Rena Inoue / John Baldwin earned the United States two entries to the 2006 Winter Olympics.

In the summer of 2005, Orscher broke her foot, causing them to lose training time before the 2005-06 season. In January 2006 at the U.S Championships in St. Louis, Missouri, they were in first after the short program but dropped to third after the long program and missed the Olympic team by .66 points.

Orscher and Lucash announced their retirement from competitive skating in April 2006.

Programs 
(with Lucash)

Competitive highlights

Pair skating with Lucash

Single skating

References

External links

1984 births
American female pair skaters
American female single skaters
People from Farmington, Connecticut
Living people
Four Continents Figure Skating Championships medalists
Sportspeople from Connecticut
21st-century American women
20th-century American women